The Landis Theatre–Mori Brothers Building is located at 830–834 Landis Avenue in the city of Vineland in Cumberland County, New Jersey. The building was built in 1937 and its first movie was Hats Off. The theater serviced the USO during World War II, and the auditorium was twinned in 1980. After 50 years of service to the Vineland community, it closed finally in 1987, victim of declining revenue against the Demarco Cinemas nearby. Its last movie was House 2. It was added to the National Register of Historic Places on November 22, 2000, for its significance in architecture, engineering, and entertainment/recreation. It was designed by Philadelphia architect William Harold Lee, who designed several historic theaters. Renovation of the theater was completed in early 2010, and it officially re-opened on May 22, with Bernadette Peters being the opening act.

See also
National Register of Historic Places listings in Cumberland County, New Jersey

References

External links
 

Theatres completed in 1937
Buildings and structures in Cumberland County, New Jersey
Streamline Moderne architecture in New Jersey
Theatres on the National Register of Historic Places in New Jersey
National Register of Historic Places in Cumberland County, New Jersey
Vineland, New Jersey
New Jersey Register of Historic Places